HNoMS Uller was a Vale-class Rendel gunboat constructed for the Royal Norwegian Navy at Karljohansverns Verft Naval Yard in Horten in 1874-1876 and had yard build number 55. She was one of a class of five gunboats - the other ships in the class were Vale, Brage, Nor and Vidar.

Uller was, in addition to the heavy, muzzle-loading main gun, armed with a small Quick Fire gun and a 37mm Hotchkiss Revolving Cannon (broadly similar to the Gatling gun).

Later Uller and her sister ships were rebuilt as minelayers, and she served in this role when the Germans invaded 9 April 1940.

The invasion

Capture
When the Germans attacked, Uller was mining the sea lanes to Bergen, and was taken by surprise by the German forces.

Sinking
After being pressed into Kriegsmarine service Uller and fellow captured minelayer HNoMS Tyr were mining the entrance to the still Norwegian-held Sognefjorden on 1 May 1940 when they were first bombed unsuccessfully by two Royal Norwegian Navy Air Service Marinens Flyvebaatfabrikk M.F.11 maritime reconnaissance aircraft of the Sognefjord Air Group and then attacked again later the same day by a Heinkel He 115 of the same unit. In the second attack Uller was hit by a bomb, beached and then scuttled by Tyr.

Notes

Bibliography

External links
 Naval history via Flix: KNM Vale, retrieved 27 Feb 2006 

Vale-class gunboats
Ships built in Horten
1876 ships
World War II minelayers of Norway
Naval ships of Norway captured by Germany during World War II
Minelayers of the Kriegsmarine
World War II minelayers of Germany
World War II shipwrecks in the Norwegian Sea
Maritime incidents in May 1940
Ships sunk by Norwegian aircraft
Ships sunk with no fatalities